The 2003 Formula 3 Sudamericana season was the 17th Formula 3 Sudamericana season. It began on 13 April 2003, at  Autódromo Internacional Orlando Moura at Campo Grande and ended on 16 November at Autódromo Internacional Nelson Piquet in Brasília. Brazilian driver Danilo Dirani won the title.

Drivers and teams
 All drivers competed in Pirelli-shod.

References

External links
 Official website

Formula 3 Sudamericana
Sudamericana
Formula 3 Sudamericana seasons
Sudamericana F3